Tej Man Angdembe is a Nepali language expert, writer and lecturer.

Bibliography
The Classical Limbu Language: Grammar and Dictionary of a Kirat Mundhum
http://www.kurumbang.com/Why%20Federalism%20last%20one%20Tej%20Man.pdf

References

Year of birth missing (living people)
Living people
Nepalese male writers
Nepalese academics
21st-century linguists